Röd (Swedish for Red) is the eighth studio album by Swedish alternative rock band Kent. It was released as digital download exclusively through the band's website on 5 November 2009 and physically on 6 November 2009. The first single from the album, "Töntarna", was released as digital download on 5 October 2009. The song "Svarta linjer" was performed on the television talk show Skavlan on 30 October.

Röd is available in a standard edition and a deluxe edition box. The deluxe edition box version features the 11-track CD, a USB flash drive with high quality MP3 files as well as AIFF files, three 10" records which between them contain the whole album, and a 118-page book containing lyrics, abstract pictures and photographs. Due to distribution difficulties the deluxe edition was delayed until 11 November 2009.

Background
Lead singer Joakim Berg announced on Kent's forum on 21 April 2009, that the band had started writing songs for the album in 2008 until the beginning of April 2009 and subsequently the band had begun the recording of the album. The album is produced by Kent and Joshua, who also produced the band's previous studio album.

Eight out of 11 songs were recorded in the concert hall Meistersaal in Berlin. It was originally part of the legendary Hansa Tonstudio from the 1970s until 1991, but has since been used as a location for events. Kent had to set up their own recording studio, with the recording costs being around 3 million SEK according to Joakim Berg.

Track listing 
All lyrics written by Joakim Berg. All music written by Joakim Berg and Martin Sköld.

Personnel 
Produced by Kent & Joshua
Recorded in Meistersaal, Berlin; Psykbunkern/Park Studio, Stockholm; The Bowery Hotel, New York City; Hyltinge Church, Sparreholm and different living rooms
Track 4, 7, 8, 11: Mixed by Simon Nordberg
Track 1, 5, 6, 9: Mixed by Stefan Boman
Track 2, 3, 10: Mixed by Joshua
All songs are mixed in Psykbunkern/Park Studio except "Det finns inga ord" which is mixed in Traxton
Mastered by Henrik Jonsson, Masters of Audio
Instrument technician: Martin Brengesjö
Assistant: Sebastian Meyer
Track 6: Choir by Johan Renck
Track 3, 9: Choir by Johan T Karlsson
Track 1: The "Tonalerna" choir led by Yngve Sköld
Track 1: Organ by Martin Sköld
Design: Helen Svensson & Thomas Ökvist
Cover photo: Annika Aschberg
Colour photo: Makode Linde
Black, red, grey photo: Thomas Ökvist
Management: Martin Roos

Charts and certifications

Weekly charts

Year-end charts

Certifications

References

External links 
Röd at Discogs

2009 albums
Kent (band) albums
Swedish-language albums
Albums produced by Joshua (record producer)